Lunney v. Prodigy Services Co., 94 N.Y.2d 242 (1999) is a leading U.S. law case on liability of internet service providers for defamation. The court held that Prodigy, an internet chatroom provider, was not considered a publisher of defamatory material posted from an imposter account due to its passive role in monitoring the chatrooms.

External links
 Decision text at FindLaw
 Petition for certiorari

New York (state) state case law
United States Internet case law
United States defamation case law
1999 in United States case law
1999 in New York (state)